Podosphaera leucotricha is a plant pathogen that can cause powdery mildew of apples and pears.

Importance 
A net-like russeting can cut the value of fruit in half and with some orchards spraying up to 15 times per growing season the economic losses from P. leucotricha are high.

Hosts and symptoms 
Powdery mildew, caused by the obligate biotrophic ascomycete Podosphaera leucotricha, is one of the major diseases of cultivated apple throughout the world. The primary host is apple, but other fruit like peaches and quince provide a host for Podosphaera leucotricha.  A list of host plants/species affected includes Cydonia oblonga (quince), Malus (apple), Prunus persica (peach), Prunus domestica (plum), Pyrus (pears), and Mespilus germanica (medlar). On apples, the fungus affects twigs, foliage, blossoms, and fruits of current season growth. Infected plants are characterized by reduced photosynthesis and transpiration, resulting suboptimal carbohydrate assimilation and reduced growth.

Podosphaera leucotricha causes a range of symptoms. On stems, symptoms include wilting and discoloration. Wilting and leaf curling occur on leaves. Symptoms of the inflorescence include discoloration (non-graminous plants), dwarfing, stunting, and twisting. On fruit symptoms include net-like russeting and deformed fruit. Depending on the stage in the disease cycle, symptoms vary. The primary blossom mildew emerges at pink bud stage. Flowers are deformed with pale green or yellow petal and are covered in white mycelium and spores. The secondary mildew may have lesions that appear as chlorotic spots on the upper leaf surface. Symptoms of the secondary mildew also included distorted leaves and premature falling of leaves.

Disease cycle 
Podosphaera leucotricha has a polycyclic disease cycle. Mycelium overwintering in dormant buds typically produces primary infection on young leaves, which produce inoculum in the form of conidia for the secondary cycles. In spring, the overwintered fungus is evident as 'primary' mildew on leaves emerged from buds infected during the previous growing season. Conidia that are (12 X 20-38 um) and are ellipsoidal, truncate and hyaline are released from the primary mildew during the colonies disperse in air and initiate an epidemic of 'secondary' mildew on growing shoots. Young developing fruitlets may also be infected. Secondary mildew epidemics are effectively continuous from day to day. The infection process does not require surface wetness. Daily infection intensity on leaves is mainly determined by the dose of landed conidia, which is dependent on the concentration of airborne conidia and wind speed. Apple shoots have a long growing season causing the tree to stay susceptible for several months. The pathogen is supposed to spread almost exclusively asexually, although ascospores might be an underrated additional source of infection. Occasionally the sexual state of P. leucotricha occurs as pin-head sized brown/black fruiting bodies (ascocarps) among mycelium on infected shoots or leaves. Although the mycelium can overwinter in dormant buds, overwintering potential is limited primarily by temperature. In severe winters, infected buds are killed as they are more susceptible to the cold than healthy buds.

Management 
Intensive applications of fungicides are usually used to control apple powdery mildew. In the UK, most commercial apple orchards receive routine sprays. This is because mildew is always present in the orchard and therefore routine chemical control measures are usually needed. Spraying occurs from green cluster until vegetative growth ceases, and occasionally post-harvest if terminal buds regrow. Once primary mildew levels are high, effective control becomes difficult. Therefore, control strategies depend on maintaining primary mildew at a low level. When levels are high, prompt physical removal of blossoms or shoots may be the only effective way to reduce inoculum levels. In organic orchards, control is based on a combination of cultural levels and fungicide use where possible, but sulphur is the only fungicide active against powdery mildew permitted for use in organic production. Cultural levels are based on removal of primary inoculum by pruning. In winter, prune out silvered shoots. At pink bud and petal fall stages, prune out primary blossom and primary blossom and primary vegetative mildew. There are times when controlling mildew is most important. June is a critical time for monitoring and mildew control as this is the period for rapid extension growth and also when fruit buds are forming and sealing for next spring. Fungicides and cultural controls are the main ways to manage P. leucotricha, however the development of apple varieties displaying durable resistance to the fungi is one of the major aims of apple breeding programs worldwide.

References

External links 
 Keepers Nursery - Apple and Pear Powdery Mildew

Fungal plant pathogens and diseases
Apple tree diseases
Pear tree diseases
leucotricha
Fungi described in 1887